Norman Adrian Wiggins (February 6, 1924 – August 1, 2007) was the third president of Campbell University in Buies Creek, North Carolina.

Biography
He was born in Burlington, North Carolina on February 6, 1924.

In 1942, Wiggins enrolled in Campbell College, which was 70 miles from his home. In 1943, he was pressed to serve as a Marine in the Pacific during World War II. After returning to Campbell in 1947, he went on to receive his Associate of Arts degree. He also met the love of his life, Mildred Harmon, and married her on April 14, 1948. By 1950, he had earned a Bachelor of Arts (magna cum laude) from Wake Forest College. In 1952, he graduated with a Bachelor of Laws (cum laude) from Wake Forest College School of Law. In his lifetime, he did achieve Master of Law and Doctor of the Science of Law from Columbia Law School.

On June 6, 1967, Wiggins became president of what was then known as Campbell College. He would remain in the position until 2003, when he retired at 79 and was honored with the title of chancellor. During his tenure, his passionate leadership inspired the establishment of five professional schools, which led to Campbell College's transformation to a university in 1979. Campbell now enrolls roughly 10,000 students, making it one of the largest Baptist universities in the country.

Wiggins died in a Winston-Salem hospital of complications from lymphoma. He had taken a short leave as university president in 2001 after being diagnosed with that form of cancer. He was survived by Millie Wiggins, his wife of more than 50 years.

External links
Campbell University Obituary  
News Observer obit

Campbell University alumni
Columbia Law School alumni
Deaths from lymphoma
People from Winston-Salem, North Carolina
Wake Forest University alumni
1924 births
2007 deaths
Deaths from cancer in North Carolina
Presidents of Campbell University
People from Burlington, North Carolina
United States Marine Corps personnel of World War II
20th-century American academics